Giles Beecher Jackson (1853–1924) was an American lawyer, newspaper publisher, entrepreneur, and civil rights activist. He was the first African-American to practice law before the Supreme Court of Virginia in 1887. Jackson co-authored “The Industrial History of the Negro Race in Virginia” (Virginia Press, 1908).

Early life and education 
Giles Beecher Jackson was born on August 13, 1853 in Goochland County, Virginia; he was African American and enslaved from birth.

Jackson moved to Richmond, Virginia after he was freed and worked as a servant. After working as a law clerk for William H. Beveridge in Richmond, Jackson decided to study law. Beveridge tutored him and encouraged his law studies.

Career 

In 1887, Jackson practice law before the Supreme Court of Virginia, making him the first African American to do so. In 1888, he helped found a bank affiliated with the United Order of True Reformers, an organization that started in Richmond as a temperance group, and expanded to other states into a business and Black fraternal society. In 1900, he became an aide to his mentor, Booker T. Washington, who had recently had founded the Boston National Negro Business League. He owned and edited the Negro Criterion, a weekly newspaper from Richmond.

In 1901, President Theodore Roosevelt had awarded Jackson with the title of honorary colonel of the third civic division (an all-Black calvary unit), with Jackson participating in the presidential inaugural parade along Pennsylvania Avenue.

Starting in 1903, Jackson found the Negro Development and Exposition Company (NDEC) headquartered in Richmond’s Jackson Ward. The NDEC was attempting to capitalize on the display of African American achievements, with the goal of creating the first national museum.

Jackson was a leader in the formation of the Negro Department (1907) at the Jamestown Exposition (also known as the Jamestown Ter-Centennial Exposition of 1907), and he had helped fundraise and obtained a grant from the United States Congress. The exhibition had received a mixed reception, with criticisms of the exhibition highlighting Black achievements in order to further enforce racial segregation. Jackson felt having the exhibition in a separate "Negro Building" allowed for a greater variety and completeness of presentation, and that it could better highlight their achievements.

In 1914, Jackson was appointed as Chief of the Negro Division of the United States Employment Service, an agency that helped find work for unemployed unskilled laborers.

Death and legacy 
He died on August 13, 1924 and is buried in Evergreen Cemetery in Richmond.

In 2007, the Virginia Department of Historic Resources erected a historical marker in Jackson's honor in the Jackson Ward neighborhood. In 2021, Richmond Mayor Levar Stoney proclaimed April 17 as "Giles B. Jackson Day" for all his accomplishments, and it was awarded on the 150th year anniversary of the historic Jackson Ward neighborhood.

Publications

See also 
 Daniel Webster Davis
 John Mitchell Jr.

References

Further reading

External links 
 

1853 births
1924 deaths
African-American lawyers
African-American activists
19th-century American newspaper publishers (people)
American businesspeople
People from Goochland County, Virginia
Lawyers from Richmond, Virginia
United States Department of Labor officials